Lisa Michaelis was a female actress/singer/musician/children's performer who was born in New York City and lived in Atlanta, Georgia, where she was the founder of Laughing Pizza Productions, a children's record and video label.

She was also a contestant on Star Search, was a performer on Broadway and is an accomplished songwriter, writing for both Dance acts and child performers.

One of the tracks she co-wrote and performed was "Rainfalls" with Frankie Knuckles. The track was a number one single on Billboard's Hot Dance Music/Club Play chart in 1992.

She died on November 29, 2015 from breast cancer.

References

See also
List of number-one dance hits (United States)
List of artists who reached number one on the US Dance chart

American dance musicians
American women singers
American children's musicians
Actresses from Atlanta
2015 deaths
Year of birth missing
21st-century American women